The Bâsca Mică is a left tributary of the river Bâsca in Romania. It discharges into the Bâsca in Varlaam.

Tributaries

The following rivers are tributaries to the river Bâsca Mică (from source to mouth):

Left: Giurgiu, Harboca Mare, Mușa, Mușica, Gada, Secuiu, Izvorul Războiului, Bouțu
Right: Manișca Mare, Bălescuțu, Bălescu Mare, Zănoaga, Pârâul Sărat, Șapte Izvoare, Ciuta Mare, Brebu, Pârâul Stânei, Paltinu, Neagra

References

Rivers of Romania
Rivers of Covasna County
Rivers of Buzău County